International Week of the Deaf (IWDeaf) is celebrated annually across the world during the last full week of September since 2009. In 2018, it was celebrated together with the official International Day of Sign Languages, declared by the United Nations (UN), for the first time.

Themes

References 

Sign language
Deaf culture
September observances
Disability observances